Twelfth Street YMCA Building, also known as Anthony Bowen YMCA, was home to the first African American chapter of YMCA, founded in 1853 by Anthony Bowen. It is located at 1816 12th Street NW in the U Street Corridor (Cardozo/Shaw) neighborhood of Washington, D.C. The building was reopened on February 20, 2000 as the Thurgood Marshall Center in honor of the first African American Associate Justice to serve on the United States Supreme Court. The Thurgood Marshall Center now serves as a community center for residents of the U Street Corridor and Shaw neighborhoods. The permanent organization of Phi Beta Sigma fraternity was established in the Bowen Room.

Completed in 1912, the Renaissance Revival building was designed by William Sidney Pittman, one of the United States' first African American architects and a son-in-law of Booker T. Washington. It was declared a National Historic Landmark in 1994 and is a contributing property to the Greater U Street Historic District.

Description and history
The Thurgood Marshall Center is located on the west side of 12th Street NW, between S and T Streets.  It is a large rectangular four-story masonry building, built out of red brick with trim of limestone and gray brick.  Its main facade is three bays wide, with a center entrance sheltered by a Tuscan portico with entablature, modillioned cornice, and low balustrade above.  The ground floor is finished in bands of gray brick arranged to appear as rough stone, while the upper floors are red brick with gray brick corner quoining. Limestone stringcourses serve as a water table between the basement and first floor, between the first and second floors, and above the top floor.  The building is crowned by a modillioned and dentillated cornice and a low balustrade.  Windows are set in pairs in each bay, with limestone keystones.

The international YMCA was founded in Great Britain in 1844, and its first American branch opened in 1851.  Anthony Bowen founded the first African-American branch of the organization in 1853 in Washington, one year after a branch for whites was opened in the city.  The organization struggled financially in its early years, and was not formally incorporated until 1892.  The organization moved into its first permanent home on 11th Street in 1891, which it soon had sell due to declining membership.  After a membership drive revitalized the organization, it secured a pledge from John D. Rockefeller Sr. of $25,000, which was matched by fundraising from across the nation's African-American community.  It is believed to be the first such campaign of its type in that community.  This building was completed in 1912 to a design by African-American architect William Sidney Pittman.

In 1973 Twelfth Street YMCA was officially renamed Anthony Bowen YMCA in honor of its founder.  It closed in 1982, suffering from declining membership and mounting building maintenance costs.  After undergoing restoration, it reopened in 2000 as the Thurgood Marshall Community Center.

Notable people 
 John Warren Davis, fifth president of West Virginia State College, served as the executive secretary of the Twelfth Street YMCA from 1917 to 1919.

See also
 List of National Historic Landmarks in the District of Columbia

References

External links
 Thurgood Marshall Center

African-American history of Washington, D.C.
Buildings and structures completed in 1912
African-American historic places
YMCA buildings in the United States
Community centers in Washington, D.C.
National Historic Landmarks in Washington, D.C.
Renaissance Revival architecture in Washington, D.C.
Clubhouses in Washington, D.C.
Clubhouses on the National Register of Historic Places in Washington, D.C.
1853 establishments in Washington, D.C.
Individually listed contributing properties to historic districts on the National Register in Washington, D.C.
U Street Corridor, Washington, D.C.